Flett Glacier refers to two glaciers on the northwestern flank of Mount Rainier in the U.S. state of Washington. The glaciers lie on a subsidiary peak of Rainier, the  Observation Rock. Meltwater from the glacier flows into the Puyallup River.

See also
List of glaciers in the United States

References

Glaciers of Mount Rainier
Glaciers of Washington (state)